The Smyrna River is a  river in central Delaware in the United States.

It rises east of Smyrna, Delaware, at the confluence of Duck Creek and Mill Creek. It flows generally northeast, forming the boundary between Kent and New Castle counties. It is navigable for its entire course.

See also
List of Delaware rivers

References

External links
EPA: Smyrna River

Rivers of Delaware
Rivers of Kent County, Delaware
Tributaries of Delaware Bay